Honored Master of Sport was a Soviet state honour, introduced on 27 May 1934 by the Central Executive Committee of the Soviet Union. It was awarded by the State Committee for Physical Culture and Sport to athletes, including chess players, for outstanding performance. The award was in the form of a badge and certificate. 22 athletes were selected for this award in June 1934, including Peter Romanovsky. Out of over 4000 awards, 52 were given to chess players, including three problem composers and two correspondence chess players. Though normally conferred for life, it was revoked in the case of Alla Kushnir and Viktor Korchnoi following their defection from the Soviet Union. Mark Taimanov also had his award revoked in 1971 following his crushing defeat at the hands of Bobby Fischer, but this was restored in 1991.

Title holders

References

See also 
Chess title

Chess titles
Chess in the Soviet Union
Lists of chess players
1934 in chess
Awards established in 1934
1934 establishments in the Soviet Union